Dyykan-Kyshtak is a village in Osh Region of Kyrgyzstan. It is part of the Kara-Suu District. Its population was 13,406 in 2021. It is a western suburb of the city of Osh.

Population

References

Populated places in Osh Region